The Super Aguri SA06 was the car with which the Super Aguri team competed in the latter part of the  Formula One season.  It was driven by Takuma Sato, who drove for the team throughout the year, and rookie campatriot Sakon Yamamoto, whose début at the German GP coincided with that of the new car.

History 

It featured revised aerodynamics, suspension and a new quick-shift gearbox, along with a lightened chassis and provided a worthwhile improvement in performance. A new livery with more red was also used. This culminated with a fine display at the Brazilian GP, where Sato finished 10th out of 16 finishers, and he and Yamamoto set ninth- and seventh-fastest laps of the race respectively.

Despite this effort, the team were unclassified in the Constructors' Championship, with no points. The car was followed by the SA07. However, the SA06 would still be used: on January 15, 2007, retired F1 drivers Aguri Suzuki (the team owner), Martin Brundle and Christian Danner all drove the car at Silverstone.

Super Aguri SA06B 
The Super Aguri SA06B debuted at the Japanese Grand Prix with updated aerodynamic parts and a narrowed rear end.

Complete Formula One results
(key) (results in bold indicate pole position)

References

Super Aguri Formula One cars
2006 Formula One season cars